Reign of Fire may refer to:

Reign of Fire (album), an album by reggae artist Capleton
Reign of Fire (film), 2002 action/science-fiction film directed by Rob Bowman
Reign of Fire (video game), a videogame based on the movie

See also
Ring of Fire (disambiguation)